Edith Erna Oker (born 1 February 1961, in Stuttgart) is a German former athlete who competed in the sprint hurdles. She represented West Germany at the 1984 Summer Olympics reaching the semifinals.

Her personal bests are 13.14 seconds in the 100 metres hurdles (+Los Angeles 1984) and 8.04 seconds in the 60 metres hurdles (Sindelfingen 1984).

International competitions

1Did not finish in the semifinals

References

1961 births
Living people
West German female hurdlers
Sportspeople from Stuttgart
Athletes (track and field) at the 1984 Summer Olympics
Olympic athletes of West Germany